In chemistry the term chicken wire  is used in different contexts. Most of them relate to the similarity of the regular hexagonal (honeycomb-like) patterns found in certain chemical compounds to the mesh structure commonly seen in real chicken wire.

Examples

Polycyclic aromatic hydrocarbons 
Polycyclic aromatic hydrocarbons or graphenes—including fullerenes, carbon nanotubes, and graphite—have a hexagonal structure that is often described as chicken wire-like.

Hexagonal molecular structures 
A hexagonal structure that is often described as chicken wire-like can also be found in other types of chemical compounds such as:

 Non-aromatic polycyclic hydrocarbons, e.g. steroids like cholesterol
 Flat hexagonal hydrogen bonded trimesic acid (benzene-1,3,5-tricarboxylic acid), boric acid, or melamine-cyanuric acid complexes
 Interwoven molecule chains in the inorganic polymer NaAuS 
 Complexes of the protein clathrin

Additional information

Bond line notation 
The skeletal formula is a method to draw structural formulas of organic compounds where lines represent the chemical bonds and the vertices represent implicit carbon atoms. This notation is sometimes jestingly called chicken wire notation.

Placeholder for organic compounds 
Chicken wire is sometimes used as a placeholder name for any organic compound, similar to the use of the name John Doe.

Chemical joke 
It is an old joke in chemistry to draw a polycyclic hexagonal chemical structure and call this fictional compound chickenwire. By adding one or two simple chemical groups to this skeleton, the compound can then be named following the official chemical naming convention. Examples are:

 1,2-Dimethyl-chickenwire in a cartoon by Nick D. Kim

Surface plots 
In computational chemistry a chicken wire model or chicken wire surface plot is a way to visualize molecular models by drawing the polygon mesh of their surface (defined e.g. as the van der Waals radius or a certain electron density).

References 

Molecular geometry